

Crown
 Head of State - Queen Elizabeth II

Federal government
 Governor General - Adrienne Clarkson

Cabinet
Prime Minister - Paul Martin
Deputy Prime Minister -  Anne McLellan
Minister of Finance -  Ralph Goodale
Minister of Foreign Affairs - Bill Graham then Pierre Pettigrew
Minister of National Defence - David Pratt then Bill Graham
Minister of Health -  Pierre Pettigrew then Ujjal Dosanjh
Minister of Industry -  Lucienne Robillard then David Emerson
Minister of Heritage -  Hélène Scherrer then Liza Frulla
Minister of Intergovernmental Affairs - Pierre Pettigrew then Lucienne Robillard
Minister of the Environment - David Anderson then Stéphane Dion
Minister of Justice -  Irwin Cotler
Minister of Transport -  Tony Valeri then Jean Lapierre
Minister of Citizenship and Immigration - Judy Sgro
Minister of Fisheries and Oceans - Geoff Regan
Minister of Agriculture and Agri-Food - Bob Speller then Andy Mitchell
Minister of Public Works and Government Services - Stephen Owen then Scott Brison
Minister of Natural Resources - John Efford
Minister of Human Resources and Skills Development - Joe Volpe
Minister of Social Development - Liza Frulla then Ken Dryden

Members of Parliament
See: 37th Canadian parliament, then 38th Canadian parliament

Party leaders
Liberal Party of Canada -  Paul Martin
Conservative Party of Canada - John Lynch-Staunton (interim) then Stephen Harper
Bloc Québécois - Gilles Duceppe
New Democratic Party - Jack Layton

Supreme Court Justices
Chief Justice: Beverley McLachlin
Frank Iacobucci retired in 2004
John C. Major
Michel Bastarache
William Ian Corneil Binnie
Louise Arbour retired in 2004
Louis LeBel
Marie Deschamps
Morris Fish
Louise Charron
Rosalie Abella

Other
Speaker of the House of Commons - Peter Milliken
Governor of the Bank of Canada - David Dodge
Chief of the Defence Staff - General R.R. Henault

Provinces & Territories

Premiers
Premier of Alberta - Ralph Klein
Premier of British Columbia - Gordon Campbell
Premier of Manitoba - Gary Doer
Premier of New Brunswick - Bernard Lord
Premier of Newfoundland and Labrador - Danny Williams
Premier of Nova Scotia - John Hamm
Premier of Ontario - Dalton McGuinty
Premier of Prince Edward Island - Pat Binns
Premier of Quebec - Jean Charest
Premier of Saskatchewan - Lorne Calvert
Premier of the Northwest Territories - Joe Handley
Premier of Nunavut - Paul Okalik
Premier of Yukon - Dennis Fentie

Lieutenant-governors
Lieutenant-Governor of Alberta - Lois Hole
Lieutenant-Governor of British Columbia - Iona Campagnolo
Lieutenant-Governor of Manitoba - Peter Liba, then John Harvard
Lieutenant-Governor of New Brunswick - Herménégilde Chiasson
Lieutenant-Governor of Newfoundland and Labrador - Edward Roberts
Lieutenant-Governor of Nova Scotia - Myra Freeman
Lieutenant-Governor of Ontario - James Bartleman
Lieutenant-Governor of Prince Edward Island - Léonce Bernard
Lieutenant-Governor of Quebec - Lise Thibault
Lieutenant-Governor of Saskatchewan - Lynda Haverstock

Mayors
Toronto - David Miller
Montreal - Gérald Tremblay
Vancouver - Larry Campbell
Ottawa - Bob Chiarelli
Winnipeg - Glen Murray then Sam Katz
Calgary - Dave Bronconnier
Edmonton - Bill Smith then Stephen Mandel
Victoria - Alan Lowe

Religious leaders
Roman Catholic Bishop of Quebec -  Cardinal Archbishop Marc Ouellet
Roman Catholic Bishop of Montreal -  Cardinal Archbishop Jean-Claude Turcotte
Roman Catholic Bishops of London - Bishop Ronald Peter Fabbro
Moderator of the United Church of Canada - Peter Short

See also
2003 Canadian incumbents
Events in Canada in 2004
 2005 Canadian incumbents
incumbents around the world in 2004
 Canadian incumbents by year

2004
Incumbents
Canadian incumbents
Canadian leaders